Frederick William Treves BEM (29 March 1925 – 30 January 2012) was an English character actor with an extensive repertoire, specialising in avuncular, military and titled types.

Early life
Treves attended the Nautical College, Pangbourne and in World War II he served in the Merchant Navy. On his first voyage his ship, the refrigerated cargo liner , was part of the Operation Pedestal convoy to Malta. On 13 August 1942 Waimarama was bombed by a German Junkers Ju 88 aircraft. The ship's deck cargo included containers of aviation spirit that burst into flame. Waimarama exploded and 83 of her 107 crew were killed.

Cadet Treves helped save several of his shipmates, including the only ship's officer to survive the sinking, Third Wireless Officer John Jackson. Treves, then seventeen years old, received the British Empire Medal and Lloyd's War Medal for Bravery at Sea for his actions.

After the war he trained at the Royal Academy of Dramatic Art.

Career
His over a hundred television credits included roles in A For Andromeda, The Cazalets, The Jewel in the Crown, A Dance to the Music of Time, The Politician's Wife, To Play the King, Lipstick on Your Collar, Summer's Lease, Bomber Harris, Trevor Griffiths' version of The Cherry Orchard, David Edgar's Destiny, The Naked Civil Servant and The Railway Children.

Treves also guested in many continuing dramas, such as All Creatures Great and Small, Rosemary & Thyme, Monarch of the Glen, The Bill, The New Adventures of Black Beauty, Silent Witness, Kavanagh QC, Jeeves and Wooster, Inspector Morse, Agatha Christie's Poirot, Lovejoy,  Rumpole of the Bailey , Yes, Prime Minister, Bergerac, Midsomer Murders, Heartbeat, Follyfoot, Miss Marple, Minder, Z-Cars, The Avengers, Doomwatch and in the Doctor Who story Meglos.

His films included Freelance (1971), One Hour to Zero (1976), Sweeney 2 (1978), Charlie Muffin (1979), The Elephant Man (1980), Nighthawks (1981), Defence of the Realm (1985), Paper Mask (1990), The Fool (1990), Afraid of the Dark (1991), Mad Dogs and Englishmen (1995) and Sunshine (1999).

As well as screen appearances, he also had a wide stage and radio career, and appeared with the National Theatre from the late-1970s in David Hare's Plenty, Bernard Shaw's The Philanderer, Arnold Wesker's Caritas, Eugene O'Neill's The Iceman Cometh, and two Shakespeares – Leonato in Much Ado About Nothing (1981) and Menenius in Coriolanus (1984).

Personal life
Treves was from a medical family; his father was a physician and his great uncle was Frederick Treves, the surgeon who became famous for discovering Joseph Merrick, the "Elephant Man". In the David Lynch film The Elephant Man, the surgeon is played by Anthony Hopkins and Treves himself appeared in the character of Alderman.

He married Jean Stott in 1956. He was survived by two sons and a daughter. His elder son is the actor Simon Treves.

Filmography

References

 Obituary – Dr Who

External links

Performances in the Theatre Archive, University of Bristol

1925 births
2012 deaths
Alumni of RADA
British Merchant Navy personnel of World War II
English male film actors
English male stage actors
English male television actors
People educated at Pangbourne College
People from Margate
Recipients of the British Empire Medal
Male actors from Kent